Sandro Alexandre Forner (born 16 December 1970) is a Brazilian football coach and former player who played as a central defender. He is the current head coach of Operário Ferroviário's under-20 team.

Playing career

Club
Known as Sandro during his playing days, Forner was born in Amparo, São Paulo, and was a Ponte Preta youth graduate. Promoted to the first-team in 1990, he played for a number of clubs until joining Coritiba in 1997.

After two seasons at Coxa, Forner moved to Fluminense in the Série C, but only featured in one match, a 1–1 away draw against Americano on 1 December 1999. After lifting the trophy, he featured in two more matches for the following year's Torneio Rio-São Paulo before departing.

Afterwards, Forner notably represented Joinville in 2002, ADAP Galo Maringá in 2005 (winning the Campeonato Paranaense Série Prata) and Paranavaí in 2006. He retired with the latter, aged 36.

International
While at Ponte, Forner represented Brazil at under-17 level in the 1986 South American U-17 Championship and the 1987 FIFA U-16 World Championship, and at under-20 level in the 1989 FIFA World Youth Championship and the 1990 Toulon Tournament.

Managerial career
Forner started his managerial career with J. Malucelli in 2008, being manager of the club's under-20 squad. On 5 August 2009, with the club now named Corinthians Paranaense, he replaced Leandro Niehues at the helm of the main squad.

On 24 April 2010, Forner joined Niehues' staff as assistant at Atlético Paranaense, and on 26 August, he was appointed at the helm of the under-20s. On 2 November 2012, he returned to J. Malucelli and was named first-team manager for the ensuing Paranaense.

Forner returned to Coritiba in 2015, initially as an assistant of the under-23 squad. He was named manager of the under-20s ahead of the 2016 Copa São Paulo de Futebol Júnior, earning plaudits for his latter work.

On 15 December 2017, Forner was announced as first-team manager of Coritiba. He was sacked the following 15 April, after 20 games in charge.

Honours

Player
ABC
Campeonato Potiguar: 1993

Coritiba
Campeonato Paranaense: 1999

Fluminense
Campeonato Brasileiro Série C: 1999

ADAP Galo Maringá
Campeonato Paranaense Série Prata: 2005

References

External links

1970 births
Living people
Footballers from São Paulo (state)
Brazilian footballers
Association football defenders
Campeonato Brasileiro Série C players
Associação Atlética Ponte Preta players
ABC Futebol Clube players
Fluminense FC players
Joinville Esporte Clube players
Coritiba Foot Ball Club players
Brazil youth international footballers
Brazil under-20 international footballers
Brazilian football managers
Campeonato Brasileiro Série B managers
Coritiba Foot Ball Club managers
Associação Atlética Ponte Preta managers
Operário Ferroviário Esporte Clube managers
People from Amparo, São Paulo